Six male athletes from Bahrain competed at the 1996 Summer Paralympics in Atlanta, United States.

See also
Bahrain at the Paralympics
Bahrain at the 1996 Summer Olympics

References 

Nations at the 1996 Summer Paralympics
1996
Summer Paralympics